Roland Richer (born June 23, 1941) is a Canadian politician, who was a Parti Québécois member of the National Assembly of Quebec for Argenteuil electoral district from 2012 to 2014

Richer was formerly a schoolteacher and school principal.  He was elected in a by-election held on June 11, 2012, which was triggered by the resignation of David Whissell on December 16, 2011, in a close race against Quebec Liberal Party candidate Lise Proulx.  The result of the by-election was considered a surprise, as Argenteuil had been a safe seat for the Quebec Liberal Party for several decades.  Coalition Avenir Québec candidate Mario Laframboise came in third.

Richer was reelected in the 2012 general election, again defeating Proulx and Laframboise.

Electoral record

* Result compared to Action démocratique

References

External links
 
 official website

Living people
Parti Québécois MNAs
1941 births
People from Laurentides
21st-century Canadian politicians